Antoine Zahra may refer to:

Antoine Zahra (legislator) (born 1956), Lebanese Maronite political figure
Antoine Zahra (footballer born 1977), Maltese midfielder
Antoine Zahra (footballer born 1981), Maltese striker

See also
Zahra (disambiguation)
Zahra (name)
Zahra (family name)